The 2001-02 Azerbaijan Top League was contested by twelve clubs. In the 2nd round of the Championship, the championship was suspended due to the conflict between the clubs and the AFFA and clubs were not allowed to the European club tournaments.

The clubs, which had stopped racing, continued their championship with the initiative of the Organizing Committee. But that part of the history, like the "alternative championship," remained unofficially. Because AFFA, UEFA and FIFA did not recognize these results.

Teams

Stadia and locations

First round

League table

Results

Second round

Championship group

Results

Relegation group

Results

Season statistics

Top scorers

References

Azerbaijan 2001-02 RSSSF

Azerbaijan Premier League seasons
Azer
1